In logic, a logical connective (also called a logical operator, sentential connective, or sentential operator) is a logical constant. They can be used to connect logical formulas.

Common connectives include negation, disjunction, conjunction, and implication. In standard systems of classical logic, these connectives are interpreted as truth functions, though they receive a variety of alternative interpretations in nonclassical logics. Their classical interpretations are similar to the meanings of natural language expressions such as English "not", "or", "and", and "if", but not identical. Discrepancies between natural language connectives and those of classical logic have motivated nonclassical approaches to natural language meaning as well as approaches which pair a classical compositional semantics with a robust pragmatics.

A logical connective is similar to, but not equivalent to, a syntax commonly used in programming languages called a conditional operator.

Overview 
In formal languages, truth functions are represented by unambiguous symbols. This allows logical statements to not be understood in an ambiguous way. These symbols are called logical connectives, logical operators, propositional operators, or, in classical logic, truth-functional connectives. For the rules which allow new well-formed formulas to be constructed by joining other well-formed formulas using truth-functional connectives, see well-formed formula.

Logical connectives can be used to link zero or more statements, so one can speak about -ary logical connectives. The boolean constants True and False can be thought of as zero-ary operators. Negation is a 1-ary connective, and so on.

Common logical connectives

List of common logical connectives
Commonly used logical connectives include:
 Negation (not): ¬ , N (prefix), ~
 Conjunction (and): ∧ , K (prefix), & , ∙
 Disjunction (or): ∨, A (prefix)
 Material implication (if...then): → , C (prefix), ⇒ , ⊃
 Biconditional (if and only if): ↔ , E (prefix), ≡ , =

Alternative names for biconditional are iff, xnor, and bi-implication.

For example, the meaning of the statements it is raining (denoted by P) and I am indoors (denoted by Q) is transformed, when the two are combined with logical connectives:
 It is not raining (P)
 It is raining and I am indoors
 It is raining or I am indoors
 If it is raining, then I am indoors
 If I am indoors, then it is raining
 I am indoors if and only if it is raining

It is also common to consider the always true formula and the always false formula to be connective:
 True formula (⊤, 1, V [prefix], or T)
 False formula (⊥, 0, O [prefix], or F)

History of notations
 Conjunction: the symbol ∧ appeared in Heyting in 1929 (compare to Peano's use of the set-theoretic notation of intersection ∩); the symbol & appeared at least in Schönfinkel in 1924; the symbol ∙ comes from Boole's interpretation of logic as an elementary algebra.
 Disjunction: the symbol ∨ appeared in Russell in 1908 (compare to Peano's use of the set-theoretic notation of union ∪); the symbol + is also used, in spite of the ambiguity coming from the fact that the + of ordinary elementary algebra is an exclusive or when interpreted logically in a two-element ring; punctually in the history a + together with a dot in the lower right corner has been used by Peirce,<ref>Peirce (1867) On an improvement in Boole's calculus of logic.</ref>
 Implication: the symbol → can be seen in Hilbert in 1917; ⊃ was used by Russell in 1908 (compare to Peano's inverted C notation); ⇒ was used in Vax.
 Biconditional: the symbol ≡ was used at least by Russell in 1908; ↔ was used at least by Tarski in 1940; ⇔ was used in Vax; other symbols appeared punctually in the history, such as ⊃⊂ in Gentzen, ~ in Schönfinkel or ⊂⊃ in Chazal.
 True: the symbol 1 comes from Boole's interpretation of logic as an elementary algebra over the two-element Boolean algebra; other notations include  (to be found in Peano).
 False: the symbol 0 comes also from Boole's interpretation of logic as a ring; other notations include  (to be found in Peano).

Some authors used letters for connectives at some time of the history: u. for conjunction (German's "und" for "and") and o. for disjunction (German's "oder" for "or") in earlier works by Hilbert (1904); Np for negation, Kpq for conjunction, Dpq for alternative denial, Apq for disjunction, Xpq for joint denial, Cpq for implication, Epq for biconditional in Łukasiewicz (1929); cf. Polish notation.

Redundancy

Such a logical connective as converse implication "←" is actually the same as material conditional with swapped arguments; thus, the symbol for converse implication is redundant. In some logical calculi (notably, in classical logic), certain essentially different compound statements are logically equivalent. Therefore, a classical-based logical system does not need the conditional operator "→" if "¬" (not) and "∨" (or) are already in use, or may use the "→" only as a syntactic sugar for a compound having one negation and one disjunction.

These correspond to possible choices of binary logical connectives for classical logic. Different implementations of classical logic can choose different functionally complete subsets of connectives.

One approach is to choose a minimal set, and define other connectives by some logical form, as in the example with the material conditional above.
The following are the minimal functionally complete sets of operators in classical logic whose arities do not exceed 2:
One element {↑}, {↓}.

Another approach is to use with equal rights connectives of a certain convenient and functionally complete, but not minimal set. This approach requires more propositional axioms, and each equivalence between logical forms must be either an axiom or provable as a theorem.

The situation, however, is more complicated in intuitionistic logic. Of its five connectives, {∧, ∨, →, ¬, ⊥}, only negation "¬" can be reduced to other connectives (see  for more). Neither conjunction, disjunction, nor material conditional has an equivalent form constructed from the other four logical connectives.

Natural language

The standard logical connectives of classical logic have rough equivalents in the grammars of natural languages. In English, as in many languages, such expressions are typically grammatical conjunctions. However, they can also take the form of complementizers, verb suffixes, and particles. The denotations of natural language connectives is a major topic of research in formal semantics, a field that studies the logical structure of natural languages.

The meanings of natural language connectives are not precisely identical to their nearest equivalents in classical logic. In particular, disjunction can receive an exclusive interpretation in many languages. Some researchers have taken this fact as evidence that natural language semantics is nonclassical. However, others maintain classical semantics by positing pragmatic accounts of exclusivity which create the illusion of nonclassicality. In such accounts, exclusivity is typically treated as a scalar implicature. Related puzzles involving disjunction include free choice inferences, Hurford's Constraint, and the contribution of disjunction in alternative questions.

Other apparent discrepancies between natural language and classical logic include the paradoxes of material implication, donkey anaphora and the problem of counterfactual conditionals. These phenomena have been taken as motivation for identifying the denotations of natural language conditionals with logical operators including the strict conditional, the variably strict conditional, as well as various dynamic operators.

The following table shows the standard classically definable approximations for the English connectives.

Properties
Some logical connectives possess properties that may be expressed in the theorems containing the connective. Some of those properties that a logical connective may have are:

 Associativity Within an expression containing two or more of the same associative connectives in a row, the order of the operations does not matter as long as the sequence of the operands is not changed.
 CommutativityThe operands of the connective may be swapped, preserving logical equivalence to the original expression.
 Idempotence Whenever the operands of the operation are the same, the compound is logically equivalent to the operand.
 Absorption A pair of connectives ∧, ∨ satisfies the absorption law if  for all operands , .
 Monotonicity If f(a1, ..., an) ≤ f(b1, ..., bn) for all a1, ..., an, b1, ..., bn ∈ {0,1} such that a1 ≤ b1, a2 ≤ b2, ..., an ≤ bn. E.g., ∨, ∧, ⊤, ⊥.
 Affinity Each variable always makes a difference in the truth-value of the operation or it never makes a difference. E.g., ¬, ↔, ⊤, ⊥.
 Duality To read the truth-value assignments for the operation from top to bottom on its truth table is the same as taking the complement of reading the table of the same or another connective from bottom to top. E.g., ¬.
 Truth-preserving The compound all those arguments are tautologies is a tautology itself. E.g., ∨, ∧, ⊤, →, ↔, ⊂ (see validity).
 Falsehood-preserving The compound all those argument are contradictions is a contradiction itself. E.g., ∨, ∧, ⊥, ⊄, ⊅ (see validity).
 Involutivity (for unary connectives) . E.g. negation in classical logic.

For classical and intuitionistic logic, the "=" symbol means that corresponding implications "...→..." and "...←..." for logical compounds can be both proved as theorems, and the "≤" symbol means that "...→..." for logical compounds is a consequence of corresponding "...→..." connectives for propositional variables. Some many-valued logics may have incompatible definitions of equivalence and order (entailment).

Both conjunction and disjunction are associative, commutative and idempotent in classical logic, most varieties of many-valued logic and intuitionistic logic. The same is true about distributivity of conjunction over disjunction and disjunction over conjunction, as well as for the absorption law.

In classical logic and some varieties of many-valued logic, conjunction and disjunction are dual, and negation is self-dual, the latter is also self-dual in intuitionistic logic. 

Order of precedence
As a way of reducing the number of necessary parentheses, one may introduce precedence rules: ¬ has higher precedence than ∧, ∧ higher than ∨, and ∨ higher than →.

Here is a table that shows a commonly used precedence of logical operators.

However, not all compilers use the same order; for instance, an ordering in which disjunction is lower precedence than implication or bi-implication has also been used. Sometimes precedence between conjunction and disjunction is unspecified requiring to provide it explicitly in given formula with parentheses. The order of precedence determines which connective is the "main connective" when interpreting a non-atomic formula.

Computer science

A truth-functional approach to logical operators is implemented as logic gates in digital circuits. Practically all digital circuits (the major exception is DRAM) are built up from NAND, NOR, NOT, and transmission gates; see more details in Truth function in computer science. Logical operators over bit vectors (corresponding to finite Boolean algebras) are bitwise operations.

But not every usage of a logical connective in computer programming has a Boolean semantic. Also, a conditional, which in some sense corresponds to the material conditional connective, is essentially non-Boolean because for if (P) then Q;, the consequent Q is not executed if the antecedent P is false (although a compound as a whole is successful ≈ "true" in such case). This is closer to intuitionist and constructivist views on the material conditional— rather than to classical logic's views.

Table and Hasse diagram

The 16 logical connectives can be partially ordered to produce the following Hasse diagram. 
The partial order is defined by declaring that  if and only if whenever  holds then so does  

See also

 Boolean domain
 Boolean function
 Boolean logic
 Boolean-valued function
 Four-valued logic
 List of Boolean algebra topics
 Logical constant
 Modal operator
 Propositional calculus
 Truth function
 Truth table
 Truth values

References

Sources

 Bocheński, Józef Maria (1959), A Précis of Mathematical Logic'', translated from the French and German editions by Otto Bird, D. Reidel, Dordrecht, South Holland.
 
 
 .

External links

Lloyd Humberstone (2010), "Sentence Connectives in Formal Logic", Stanford Encyclopedia of Philosophy (An abstract algebraic logic approach to connectives.)
John MacFarlane (2005), "Logical constants", Stanford Encyclopedia of Philosophy.

 
Connective

da:Logisk konnektiv